In music, Op. 118 stands for Opus number 118. Compositions that are assigned this number include:

 Beethoven – Elegischer Gesang
 Brahms – Six Pieces for Piano
 Fauré – L'horizon chimérique
 Prokofiev – The Tale of the Stone Flower
 Schumann – Drei Sonaten für die Jugend (Three Piano Sonatas for the Young)
 Shostakovich – String Quartet No. 10